The 1922 San Jose State Spartans football team represented State Teachers College at San Jose during the 1922 college football season.

San Jose State competed in the inaugural season of the California Coast Conference (CCC). The team was led by second-year head coach David Wooster, and they played home games at Spartan Field in San Jose, California. The team finished the season with a record of two wins, five losses and one tie (2–5–1, 0–3 CCC). The Spartans were outscored by their opponents 34-127 for the season, including being shutout in their last four games.

Schedule

Notes

References

San Jose State
San Jose State Spartans football seasons
San Jose State Spartans football